The Annual Bulletin of the Comparative Law Bureau of the American Bar Association (ABA) was a U.S. specialty law journal (1908–1914, 1933). The first comparative law journal in the United States, it surveyed foreign legislation and legal literature. Circulated to all ABA members, it was absorbed in 1915 by the newly formed American Bar Association Journal.

History

Bureau
In 1905, a committee of the Pennsylvania State Bar Association considered the creation of a comparative law society and recommended to bring such large project to the American Bar Association. The ABA created such entity at its 1907 annual meeting, as a new section named the Comparative Law Bureau: the Bureau members would meet annually at the ABA's summer meeting and publish an annual bulletin.

The Bureau's officers included: Simeon E. Baldwin (as director, 1907–1919; ABA co-founder and president, later Governor of Connecticut) and William Smithers (as secretary, also the chairman of the Bulletins editorial staff). The Bureau's managers included: James Barr Ames (dean at Harvard), George Kirchwey (dean at Columbia), William Draper Lewis  (dean at Pennsylvania, later the founding director of the American Law Institute), and John Henry Wigmore (dean at Northwestern).

The Bureau's aims were presented in the Bulletin'''s first issue: (1) to publish an annual Bulletin with foreign legislation and reviews of foreign legal literature; (2) to translate and publish foreign legislation as well as relevant expert opinions; (3) to hold an annual conference for discussing comparative law; (4) to improve means by which foreign laws can become available to U.S. lawyers; (5) to promote research in the areas of foreign law; (6) to establish a list of foreign correspondents; and (7) to gather information on foreign law, such as bibliographies, for the benefit of practicing lawyers, law teachers, and students.

The Bureau met annually and published its Bulletin (separately, then within the Journal) until financial difficulties in the 1930s due to the Great Depression. In 1933, after publishing an ultimate separate Bulletin, the Bureau was merged with the ABA's International Law section, forming the ABA Section of International & Comparative Law.

Bulletin
In July 1908, the Annual Bulletin (no ISSN) was founded by the Bureau. The first comparative law journal in the United States, it provided a survey of foreign legislation and legal literature. Its first issue was a 200 or so page bulletin.

The editor (chairman of the editorial staff) was Bureau secretary Smithers (from Philadelphia, where was also the Bulletins printer). The editorial staff in 1908 included: Simeon E. Baldwin (Yale) for general jurisprudence; Ernest Lorenzen (George Washington) and Roscoe Pound (then at Northwestern) for Germany; Charles Wetherill for Great Britain; Masuji Miyakawa for Japan; Leo Rowe (University of Pennsylvania) for Latin America; William Hastings (University of Nebraska, dean in 1910) for Russia; Samuel Scott for Spain; and Gordon Sherman for Switzerland. There were foreign correspondents from fourteen countries, including Gaston de Leval from Belgium and Eugen Huber (creator of the Swiss civil code of 1907, still in force) from Switzerland.

The Bulletin was circulated to all ABA members and to other subscribers. Published by International Printing Co. in  Philadelphia, it ran from July 1, 1908, to July 1, 1914, for volume 1 to 7.

The separate Bulletin was discontinued for two reasons: in 1914, World War I disrupted cross-Atlantic connections; and in 1915, the ABA started publishing its own Journal, into which the Bulletin was merged as an annual issue. (Though in 1933, there was an ultimate separate Bulletin, 215 page long. And in 1964, two backissues were reprinted.)

Journal

In 1915, the American Bar Association Journal was founded by the American Bar Association as a quarterly magazine (it became monthly in 1921). From 1915 to 1928, the Bulletin was merged into it: the Comparative Law Bureau controlled the second issue each year, the April number. Bureau issues stopped in 1929, but comparative and foreign law articles still regularly appeared in the Journal (about five to ten per volume).

Notes

References
Sources used for this article:
 Clark, David S. (2005). "Establishing Comparative Law in the United States: The First Fifty Years" (HTML from the original PDF), Washington University Global Studies Law Review, vol. 4:583–593, October 28, 2005, esp. p. 584 & 588–589 — With a short history of the Bulletin and early Journal.
 LOC (2009). "Annual bulletin (American Bar Association. Comparative Law Bureau)",  (also ), Library of Congress Online Catalog, consulted in March 2009
 LOC (2009). "Bulletin for 1933",  (also ), Library of Congress Online Catalog, consulted in March 2009 — With a brief history of the Bulletin in Notes.

Further reading
Annual Report of the American Bar Association
 (For 1914 apparently not available online.)
  — Bulletin merged into the new Journal''.
 
 (For 1933 apparently not available online.)

American law journals
Annual journals
Comparative law journals
Defunct journals of the United States
English-language journals
Publications disestablished in 1933
Publications established in 1908
American Bar Association
1908 establishments in the United States
Academic journals associated with learned and professional societies of the United States